Hrayr Mkoyan (born 2 September 1986) is an Armenian football player who currently plays defender for the Armenia national football team and Armenian Premier League side FC Ararat Yerevan.

Club career

Ararat Yerevan
Hrayr Mkoyan spent his youth career at Shirak Gyumri. He debuted for the first team at 18 years of age. In 2007, Mkoyan attracted breeders from Ararat Yerevan. For two seasons at the Yerevan team, Hrayr spent 47 meetings. Normal performance for the club prevented a permanent objective and subjective pressure on Ararat.

Ulisses
In 2009, Mkoyan moved on loan to the capital club Ulisses Yerevan, with whom he won third place in the 2009 Armenian Premier League. However, after the lease agreement, Hrayr left Ulisses and signed a two-year contract with Mika Yerevan.

Mika
On 22 December 2009, at the headquarters of the Football Federation of Armenia ceremony of awarding the players of last season took place, during which the winner of the award Armenian Footballer of the Year in 2009 was declared. Based on the voting, Hrayr took second place, losing the title to Henrikh Mkhitaryan.

Spartak Nalchik
On 12 January 2012, Mkoyan signed an agreement with the semi-annual club Spartak Nalchik. According to the agreement, if the Spartak will retain a place in the Russian Premier League, the contract will be extended for two years. Otherwise Hrayr leave the club in the status of a free agent. Spartak took the last place in the First Division, and fell to the Russian National Football League, and Mkoyan became a free agent.

Shirak
In June, it was reported Mkoyan return to his native club Shirak Gyumri. Mkoyan himself did not refuse such an opportunity, if any. The parties were clearly set to work, and in the middle of the month the contract flock signature of both parties. Mkoyan officially returned to the location of the club where his career began, and the club returned to the existing experienced players to participate not only in the domestic competition, but also in European competition. The agreement is designed for six months.

Loan to Dynamo
On 9 February 2013, Mkoyan tried out for Czech club Dynamo České Budějovice. He joined the club two days later. According to head coach Miroslav Soukup, "Mkoyan made a good impression in a short time, and I think he will make our team stronger." A contract valid until the end of next season was signed.

Esteghlal
On 16 June 2014, Mkoyan joined Iran Pro League club Esteghlal. He signed a two-year contract with the club.

Shirak
On 30 January 2018, Mkoyan returned to his native club FC Shirak, signing a six-month contract.

Alashkert
After starting the 2018/19 season with FC Ararat-Armenia, Mkoyan signed a one-year contract with FC Alashkert on 28 August 2018.

Ararat Yerevan
On 28 July 2020, FC Ararat Yerevan announced the signing of Mkoyan.

International career

Between performances for Ararat Yerevan, Mkoyan was involved in the ranks of the youth Armenia U-21 national team, which he played seven games for.

Since 2009, he plays for the Armenia national football team. Mkoyan debuted on 9 September 2009, in a 2010 FIFA World Cup qualification match against Belgium. The match took place in the Yerevan Republican Stadium and ended 2–1 in victory by the Armenia national team.

Career statistics

Club

International

Scores and results list Armenia's goal tally first, score column indicates score after each Armenia goal.

Honours

Club
Ararat Yerevan
Armenian Premier League Runner-up (1): 2008
Armenian Cup (1): 2008
Armenian Cup Runner-up (1): 2007

Mika
Armenian Cup (1): 2011

References

External links

 Profile at ffa.am
 armfootball.tripod.com
 
 
 
 
 sports.ru
 

1986 births
Living people
Footballers from Gyumri
Armenian footballers
Association football defenders
Armenia international footballers
FC Shirak players
FC Ararat Yerevan players
Ulisses FC players
FC Mika players
PFC Spartak Nalchik players
SK Dynamo České Budějovice players
FC Gandzasar Kapan players
Esteghlal F.C. players
FC Ararat-Armenia players
FC Alashkert players
Armenian Premier League players
Russian Premier League players
Czech First League players
Persian Gulf Pro League players
Armenian expatriate footballers
Expatriate footballers in Russia
Expatriate footballers in the Czech Republic
Expatriate footballers in Iran
Armenian expatriate sportspeople in Russia
Armenian expatriate sportspeople in the Czech Republic
Armenian expatriate sportspeople in Iran